The reprojection error is a geometric error corresponding to the image distance between a projected point and a measured one. It is used to quantify how closely an estimate of a 3D point  recreates the point's true projection .

Minimizing the reprojection error can be used for estimating the error from point correspondences between two images. Suppose we are given 2D to 2D point imperfect correspondences .

So the correspondences can be interpreted as imperfect images of a world point and the reprojection error quantifies their deviation from the true image projections

References

Geometry in computer vision